WZXL (100.7 FM, "100.7 ZXL") is a radio station also known as "South Jersey's Rock Station", playing classic rock. WZXL is licensed to Wildwood, New Jersey.

Operating with 38,000 watts, WZXL serves the greater South Jersey area including Atlantic City, Cape May, Long Beach Island, and Cumberland County. WZXL's signal also reaches Sussex County, Delaware and the Eastern Shore of Maryland. WZXL's transmitter is located along Avalon Boulevard, just east of Swainton, while studios are on Black Horse Pike in the West Atlantic City section of Egg Harbor Township. And the north of Ocean County, New Jersey

History
The 100.7 frequency was originally used in the 1940s by the owners of 1490 WBAB as 100.7 WBAB-FM. However, WBAB-FM was gone by the early 1950s and the frequency was silent in the Atlantic-Cape May market for nearly a decade.

In 1959, the owners of WCMC 1230 in Wildwood began using the 100.7 frequency as WCMC-FM.  WCMC-FM mostly simulcast WCMC, which at the time was a "middle of the road" format. The FM frequency did distinguish itself from the AM however by broadcasting Philadelphia Phillies games.

In 1981, WCMC-FM changed its call letters to WNBR and began playing adult contemporary music. The WCMC-FM calls eventually wound up on a station in North Carolina.

On November 26, 1986, WNBR signed on for the first time as 100.7 WZXL, playing a rock format that it continues to play to this day.
Longtime air personality Steve Raymond is the station's current program and music director, in addition to hosting the Midday Show.

WZXL is known for celebrating its listeners, and once a year has a listener appreciation party known as the "Bike Bash." Recent Bike Bashes have been held at the Golden Nugget casino and the House of Blues at Showboat Atlantic City.

Personalities
In addition to Steve Raymond, notable on air personalities also include JoJo and Scotty in the Morning. In 2013, 100.7 WZXL became the official South Jersey flagship of Philadelphia Phillies baseball.

On Sundays, WZXL plays the nationally syndicated Flashback radio program hosted by Matt Pinfield and Sammy Hagar's Top Rock Countdown.

Signal note
WZXL is short-spaced to two other Class B stations operating on 100.7 MHz: WLEV 100.7 WLEV (licensed to serve Allentown, Pennsylvania) and WZBA 100.7 The Bay (licensed to serve Westminster, Maryland). The distance between WZXL's transmitter and WLEV's transmitter is only , while the distance between WZXL's transmitter and WZBA's transmitter is only , as determined by FCC rules. The minimum distance between two Class B stations operating on the same channel according to current FCC rules is 150 miles.

References

External links

ZXL
Classic rock radio stations in the United States